Lunenburg High School is the high school of the town of Lunenburg, Massachusetts, United States in north-eastern Worcester County. The school educates students from Lunenburg. In 2016, a new Middle/High School building was completed.

Administration
 Timothy Santry - Principal (Acting) 
 Robert McGrath - Assistant Principal
 Karma Tousignant - Assistant Principal 
 Annica Scott - Dean of Students

Notable alumni 
Gordon Edes - sportswriter for the Boston Globe
Christopher Dijak - professional wrestler currently signed to WWE, competing under the ring name of Donovan Dijak
Bob White - former NFL player

Athletics 
The school is a member of the Massachusetts Interscholastic Athletic Association. It is classified as District D and a part of the Midland Wachusett League. The school mascot is the Blue Knight.

After allegations of racism against its football program in 2013, the school cancelled the final game of the season. Teammates were initially suspected of spray painting racist slurs on a biracial player's house, but police and the FBI later investigated the player's mother, and the students were cleared of any wrongdoing. After an investigation, Worcester County District Attorney Joseph D. Early, Jr. stated that "evidence presented to us fails to demonstrate beyond a reasonable doubt that a crime has been committed," but that the case remains open.

References

External links 
Lunenburg High School
Lunenburg’s Hall lines up charter class for induction

Public high schools in Massachusetts
Schools in Worcester County, Massachusetts